Bystrom is a census-designated place (CDP) in Stanislaus County, California, United States. The population was 4,008 at the 2010 census, down from 4,518 at the 2000 census. It is part of the Modesto Metropolitan Statistical Area.

Geography
Bystrom is located at  (37.619981, -120.979790) in South Modesto, CA.

Demographics

2010
At the 2010 census Bystrom had a population of 4,008. The racial makeup of Bystrom was 2,006 (50.0%) White, 79 (2.0%) African American, 62 (1.5%) Native American, 91 (2.3%) Asian, 18 (0.4%) Pacific Islander, 1,580 (39.4%) from other races, and 172 (4.3%) from two or more races. Hispanic or Latino of any race were 3,053 persons (76.2%).

The census reported that 3,978 people (99.3% of the population) lived in households, 30 (0.7%) lived in non-institutionalized group quarters, and no one was institutionalized.

There were 1,072 households, 557 (52.0%) had children under the age of 18 living in them, 489 (45.6%) were opposite-sex married couples living together, 217 (20.2%) had a female householder with no husband present, 120 (11.2%) had a male householder with no wife present.  There were 123 (11.5%) unmarried opposite-sex partnerships, and 5 (0.5%) same-sex married couples or partnerships. 172 households (16.0%) were one person and 55 (5.1%) had someone living alone who was 65 or older. The average household size was 3.71.  There were 826 families (77.1% of households); the average family size was 4.14.

The age distribution was 1,335 people (33.3%) under the age of 18, 443 people (11.1%) aged 18 to 24, 1,128 people (28.1%) aged 25 to 44, 825 people (20.6%) aged 45 to 64, and 277 people (6.9%) who were 65 or older.  The median age was 28.3 years. For every 100 females, there were 110.0 males.  For every 100 females age 18 and over, there were 110.5 males.

There were 1,156 housing units at an average density of 1,589.9 per square mile, of the occupied units 529 (49.3%) were owner-occupied and 543 (50.7%) were rented. The homeowner vacancy rate was 0.2%; the rental vacancy rate was 8.9%.  1,909 people (47.6% of the population) lived in owner-occupied housing units and 2,069 people (51.6%) lived in rental housing units.

2000
At the 2000 census there were 4,518 people, 1,308 households, and 1,011 families in the CDP. The racial makeup of the CDP was 54.21% White, 2.57% African American, 1.68% Native American, 3.10% Asian, 0.49% Pacific Islander, 33.51% from other races, and 4.45% from two or more races. Hispanic or Latino of any race were 56.22%.

Of the 1,308 households 42.7% had children under the age of 18 living with them, 53.5% were married couples living together, 15.8% had a female householder with no husband present, and 22.7% were non-families. 17.3% of households were one person and 6.2% were one person aged 65 or older.  The average household size was 3.41 and the average family size was 3.84.

The age distribution was 32.3% under the age of 18, 11.1% from 18 to 24, 27.9% from 25 to 44, 19.5% from 45 to 64, and 9.1% 65 or older.  The median age was 30 years. For every 100 females, there were 101.9 males.  For every 100 females age 18 and over, there were 103.1 males.

The median household income was $27,582 and the median family income  was $28,698. Males had a median income of $27,351 versus $18,393 for females. The per capita income for the CDP was $13,108.  About 26.8% of families and 30.7% of the population were below the poverty line, including 42.0% of those under age 18 and 6.7% of those age 65 or over.

Government

References

Census-designated places in Stanislaus County, California
Census-designated places in California